Asael ("Made by God") is a Hebrew name.

Asael, son of  Zeruiah, nephew of King David, David's Mighty Warriors
Asael Bielski, Second-in-command of the Bielski partisans during World War II
Asael Lubotzky, Israeli author, physician  
Asael Ben Shabat, Israeli footballer

Hebrew-language surnames
Jewish surnames
Jewish given names
Hebrew masculine given names